USS Empress (SP-569) was a United States Navy passenger barge in commission during 1917.

Empress was built as a commercial barge in 1912. On 17 October 1917, the U.S. Navy acquired her for use as a passenger barge during World War I. Assigned the section patrol number 569, she entered service as USS Empress (SP-569).

Empress was under tow from New York City to Newport, Rhode Island, when her seams opened and she sank on 4 November 1917.

References
 SP-569 Empress at Department of the Navy Naval History and Heritage Command Online Library of Selected Images: U.S. Navy Ships -- Listed by Hull Number: "SP" #s and "ID" #s -- World War I Era Patrol Vessels and other Acquired Ships and Craft numbered from SP-500 through SP-599
 NavSource Online: Section Patrol Craft Photo Archive: Empress (SP 569)

 

Auxiliary ships of the United States Navy
World War I auxiliary ships of the United States
1912 ships
Maritime incidents in 1917
Shipwrecks in the Atlantic Ocean